The Baja California whiptail (Aspidoscelis labialis) is a species of teiid lizard endemic to the Baja California Peninsula in Mexico.

References

Reptiles described in 1890
Taxa named by Leonhard Stejneger
Reptiles of Mexico